The Electric Hippies is the debut and only studio album by Australian dance group, Electric Hippies. It was
released in October 1994 and peaked at number 25 on the ARIA Charts.

At the ARIA Music Awards of 1995, Simon Anderson's work was nominated for ARIA Award for Best Cover Art.

Track listing

Charts

Release history

References

1994 debut albums
Electric Hippies albums